is a Japanese science fantasy light novel series written by Keisuke Makino and illustrated by Karei. Shogakukan have published seven volumes since December 2016 under their Gagaga Bunko label. The light novel is licensed in North America by Seven Seas Entertainment under their Airship light novel imprint. A manga adaptation with art by Sojihogu has been serialized online via Kodansha's Comic Days website since March 2018 and has been collected in a single tankōbon volume. An anime television series adaptation by Arvo Animation aired from October to December 2021.

Plot
With the conclusion of World War II in 1945, the world is divided between two major superpowers: the Republic of Zirnitra (based on the Soviet Union) in the east and the United Kingdom of Arnak (based on the United States) in the west. With their borders set on earth, both superpowers look to space as the next frontier for expansion, sparking a space race. However, Zirnitra has a trump card in the form of Irina Luminesk, a vampire who they hope to use as a test subject to spearhead research into achieving the first human spaceflight. In order to ensure her training goes smoothly, the young cosmonaut candidate Lev Leps is assigned to be her handler. While he is instructed to treat Irina as nothing more than a test subject, Lev cannot help but be fascinated with the young vampire girl.

Characters

A vampire girl. She is treated by people as a "cursed race" and hates humans. For some reason, she has a strong will to go to the moon, and aims to become an astronaut. Over the course of the series, she slowly develops feelings towards Lev due to him treating her like a person.

A lieutenant in the Air Force. He has longed to fly since he was a child. He volunteered to be an astronaut candidate. He has a strong sense of justice and rebels against unreasonable things. Over the course of the series, he bonds with Irina, even letting her drink his blood, and falls in love with her. In episode 11, he realizes his dream and becomes the first human astronaut in the series.

A researcher at the Biomedical Research Institute. She specializes in studying the biology of vampires. She is in charge of checking Irina's medical data. For this reason, she is not afraid of Irina, and treats her in a friendly manner.

An astronaut candidate and a lieutenant in the Air Force. Handsome with a good family background. His grades are always at the top, and he plays a leading role. Acknowledged by himself and others as the most promising astronaut candidate.

The only female astronaut candidate. A lieutenant in the Air Force. A former ace pilot who was called the "White Rose of Sunglade." She has a strong competitive spirit, and tends to be harsh to the other candidates around her.

A genius engineer who creates spaceships for the Republic of Zirnitra. His existence is kept secret from the public, and he is referred to only by his title, "Chief Designer."

An instructor of astronaut cadets and a hero of the last great war. A strong, muscular man with a large face. He is strict, but he is also very compassionate.

A matron of the communal dormitory where astronaut candidates live. With her gentle, maternal smile, she treats everyone with kindness.

A supreme leader of the Republic of Zirnitra. He came to this position after overthrowing the previous regime. While he has a cheerful and lively impression, he also has a side that silences those around him with a strong sense of intimidation and cold-heartedness.

A secretary in charge of documents for Fjodor Gergiev. A member of the old aristocracy, she is one of the few people who can give Gergiev opinions without hesitation. She always eats something sweet.

An unknown person who narrates the story.

Media

Light novels

Manga
A manga adaptation with art by Sojihogu began serialization on Kodansha's Comic Days website on March 8, 2018. It has been collected in a single tankōbon volume. The adaptation went on an indefinite hiatus in January 2019 due to Sojihogu's poor health.

Anime
An anime television series adaptation was announced on March 17, 2021. The series was animated by Arvo Animation and directed by Akitoshi Yokoyama, with series author Keisuke Makino handling series' composition, Hiromi Kato designing the characters, and Yasunori Mitsuda composing the score. It aired from October 4 to December 20, 2021 on TV Tokyo, BS NTV, SUN, and KBS Kyoto. The opening theme song, is performed by Ali Project while the ending theme song, is performed by Chima. Funimation licensed the series outside of Asia. Medialink licensed the series in Asia-Pacific, it is streamed on the Ani-One YouTube channel with ULTRA membership, iQIYI, and Bilibili.

Episode list

Reception
Irina: The Vampire Cosmonaut was awarded the 53rd Seiun Award in the Best Japanese Long Story category in 2022.

Notes

References

External links
  
 

2016 Japanese novels
Alternate history anime and manga
Anime and manga based on light novels
Arvo Animation
Fantasy anime and manga
Fiction set in the 1950s
Funimation
Gagaga Bunko
Japanese webcomics
Kodansha manga
Light novels
Novels about spaceflight
Novels set during the Cold War
Novels set in outer space
Science fiction anime and manga
Seinen manga
Seven Seas Entertainment titles
Television series about the Cold War
Vampires in anime and manga
Webcomics in print
Works about space programs